Dawson County Courthouse may refer to:

Dawson County Courthouse (Georgia), Dawsonville, Georgia
Dawson County Courthouse (Nebraska), Lexington, Nebraska
Dawson County Courthouse (Texas), Lamesa, Texas